Solomon ben Chaim Baruch Brück (died ) was a Hebrew writer from Lemberg, Austria. He is the author of Ḥakirat ha-Emet (Altona, 1839), a volume of collectanea, including an English sermon which he delivered in England. His other work, Ḥezionei Layil, was published posthumously by his son. The work consists of a series of imaginary dream-visits to the other world, in which the manners and conduct of certain classes are severely criticized.

References
 

Year of birth unknown
1846 deaths
Austrian Jews
Hebrew-language writers
Jewish Ukrainian writers
Writers from Lviv